"Glory to Ukraine!" is a Ukrainian national salute, known as a symbol of Ukrainian sovereignty and resistance to foreign aggression. It is the  battle cry of the Armed Forces of Ukraine, and is often accompanied by the response "Glory to the heroes!".

The phrase first appeared at the beginning of the 20th century in different variations, when it became popular among Ukrainians during the Ukrainian War of Independence from 1917 to 1921. From the 1930s it was used by different Ukrainian groups, as well as Ukrainian diaspora groups and refugee communities in the West during the Cold War. In the Soviet Union the phrase was forbidden and discredited by Soviet and later Russian authorities. The phrase eventually resurfaced in Ukraine during the country's struggle for independence in connection with the fall of the Soviet Union. Its use was revived again during the 2014 Ukrainian revolution and the Russo-Ukrainian War, during which it became a widely popular symbol in Ukraine.

The phrase has gained worldwide attention during the ongoing 2022 Russian invasion of Ukraine and has subsequently been used in protests in support of Ukraine around the world. It has been used in speeches by Ukrainian politicians like President Volodymyr Zelenskyy, as well as numerous foreign leaders.

History

Origins
A similar phrase, "Glory of Ukraine", has been used at least since the time of the prominent patriotic Ukrainian writer Taras Shevchenko. In his poem To Osnovianenko («До Основ'яненка»; 1840, in the version of 1860) Shevchenko wrote:

In the 1877 drama L'Hetman by the French author Paul Déroulède, the main character, Hetman Frol Gherasz, uses "Glory to Ukraine!" as a salute. The events of the drama take place during the Khmelnytsky Uprising, which indicates that the phrase may have been in use in the Cossack Hetmanate.

The first known mention of the slogan "Glory to Ukraine!" with the response "Glory all around the world!" (Po vsiy zemli slava) is in connection with the Ukrainian student community of the late 19th to early 20th centuries in Kharkiv.

Ukrainian War of Independence and World War II

The phrase "" (Glory to Ukraine!) had its origins during the Ukrainian War of Independence (from 1917 to 1921). It became part of the lexicon of Ukrainian nationalists in the 1920s and 1930s.

The modern response "" (Glory to the heroes!) appeared in the 1930s among members of the Organization of Ukrainian Nationalists (OUN) and Ukrainian Insurgent Army (UPA). The greeting "Glory to Ukraine! Glory to the heroes!" later became the official slogan of Stepan Bandera's OUN-B in April 1941.

Soviet era and late 20th century
In the Soviet Union, the slogan "Slava Ukraini!" was forbidden and discredited via a decades-long propaganda campaign alongside the diaspora Ukrainian nationalists who used it. They were dubbed "Ukrainian bourgeois nationalists", "Banderites", and "Nazi henchmen" by Soviet authorities.

In the late 1980s and early 1990s, the slogan began to be heard at rallies and demonstrations. After Ukraine declared independence in 1991, the phrase "Glory to Ukraine" became a common patriotic slogan. In 1995, President of the United States Bill Clinton used the phrase in a speech in Kyiv (together with "God bless America").

Russo-Ukrainian War

The phrase has undergone a resurgence in recent times, becoming a popular and prominent refrain during the 2014 Ukrainian revolution, and a symbol of democracy and of resistance against Putin's Russia following the Russian invasion of Ukraine. Canadian historian Serhy Yekelchyk writes that "the nationalist greeting from the 1940s [...] acquired new meaning on the Maidan", and that "when used by protestors, [the slogan] referred to a hoped-for democratic and pro-Western Ukraine and regarded as heroes those who had fallen in service to their cause." According to political scientist Vyacheslav Likhachev, even variations that had far-right connotations lost that meaning during Euromaidan, for example, nearly every public speech, as well as public greetings began/ended with "Glory to Ukraine – glory to the heroes!" He noted that by the Equality March in 2021, the annual LGBTQ+ event in Kyiv, other variations like "Glory to the nation – death to the enemies!" were chanted by participants spontaneously. They had long become ubiquitous enough to lose any aggressive meaning.

On 9 August 2018, Ukrainian President Petro Poroshenko announced that "Glory to Ukraine" would be the official greeting of the Armed Forces of Ukraine, replacing "Hello comrades". The greeting was used during the Kyiv Independence Day Parade on 24 August 2018. The Ukrainian parliament approved the President's bill on this (in its first reading) on 6 September and on 4 October 2018. Parliament also made Glory to Ukraine the official greeting of the National Police of Ukraine.

The popularization of the phrase was sometimes controversial abroad. After Croatia's 2018 FIFA World Cup victory, Croatia's assistant coach was fined by the football governing body FIFA after posting a video in which he used the slogan. In response, on 10 July 2018, Ukrainian supporters flooded FIFA's Facebook page with over 158,000 comments, most saying "Glory to Ukraine". Russia alleged that the chant has ultra-nationalist connotations. The Football Federation of Ukraine said in a statement that "'Glory to Ukraine' is a commonly used greeting in Ukraine," and that it "should not be interpreted as an act of aggression or provocation".

2022 Russian invasion of Ukraine

This phrase became very popular among Ukrainian soldiers and their supporters to boost morale following the Russian invasion of Ukraine. The slogan has seen worldwide use by protesters in solidarity with Ukraine all over the world, accompanying various demands towards the Russian embassies and the relevant national governments such as excluding Russia from SWIFT and closing airspace over Ukraine.

It has been used in speeches by numerous Ukrainian politicians including President Volodymyr Zelenskyy. It has also been used by foreign leaders including European Commission President Ursula von der Leyen, former British Prime Minister Boris Johnson, New Zealand Prime Minister Jacinda Ardern, Dutch Prime Minister Mark Rutte, Croatian Prime Minister Andrej Plenković, U.S. Speaker Nancy Pelosi and the UK's Permanent Representative Barbara Woodward in a speech to the UN. It has been used by commentators and media such as The Times.

Impact

Music 
The Norwegian Armed Forces' official composer Marcus Paus composed the song "Slava Ukraini!," loosely inspired by Ukraine's national anthem. Paus released the work on Facebook on 27 February 2022 and described it as a song of resistance; it was recorded two days later by Lithuanian-Norwegian viola player Povilas Syrrist-Gelgota of the Oslo Philharmonic, and was broadcast shortly afterwards by the Norwegian government broadcaster, NRK. Paus said that "the work seems to strike a chord with many people, including those who are in the middle of the battle zone. There is no nobler task for music than to unite and comfort people."

Beyond Europe, the song "Glory to Hong Kong" drew inspiration from the slogan for use in the 2019–20 Hong Kong protests. The Chinese edition of Deutsche Welle named "Glory to Hong Kong" the "anthem" of the Hong Kong protests. Describing the song, Chinese Television System News in Taiwan noted that the song had "peaceful vocals coupled with scenes of bloody conflicts between Hong Kong Police and the people" and that by creating "Glory to Hong Kong", Hongkongers recorded their "history of struggling for democracy and freedom". The connection between Ukraine and Hong Kong was received extremely negatively in mainland China, with Chinese commentators alleging American instigation of the Revolution of Dignity and Ukrainian Neo-Nazis meddling in Hong Kong affairs, going uncensored by the Great Firewall.

Commemorative currency 

The 2 euro commemorative coin issued by the Bank of Estonia in 2022 features the words "Slava Ukraini" (Glory to Ukraine), which was designed by Daria Titova, a Ukrainian refugee studying at the Estonian Academy of Arts.

Notes

References

National symbols of Ukraine
Ukrainian phrases
National mottos
Ukrainian nationalism
Slogans
Propaganda in Ukraine related to the 2022 Russian invasion of Ukraine
2022 Russian invasion of Ukraine